Papyrus 7 (in the Gregory-Aland numbering), or ε 11 (von Soden), designated by , is an early copy of the New Testament in Greek. It is a papyrus manuscript of the Gospel of Luke 4:1-2. Possibly it is a patristic fragment (like e.g. P. Oxy. 405, fragment of Against Heresies by Irenaeus containing Gospel of Matthew 3:16-17). The manuscript had been difficult to date palaeographically, because of its fragmentary condition. It had been assigned to the 4th–6th century (or even the 3rd century).

Text
The Greek text of this codex is too brief to classify (possibly it is a representative of the Alexandrian text-type). Aland did not place it in any of Categories of New Testament manuscripts.

C. R. Gregory examined the manuscript in 1903 in Kiev.

Location
It is currently housed at the Vernadsky National Library of Ukraine (Petrov 553) in Kyiv.

See also 

 List of New Testament papyri
 Luke 4

References

Further reading 

 Kurt Aland, Neue neutestamentliche Papyri, NTS 3 (1957), pp. 261–265.

External links
 Digital image of P7 at CSNTM

Papyrus 0007
Papyrus 0007
Gospel of Luke papyri